Camaroglobulus is a fungal genus in the family Mytilinidiaceae. It is monotypic, containing the single anamorphic species Camaroglobulus resinae, found in Brazil and described as new to science in 1986.

References

External links

Fungi of Brazil
Mytilinidiales
Monotypic Dothideomycetes genera
Taxa described in 1986